The Guernsey national netball team represents Guernsey in international netball.

References

 Official webpage

National netball teams of Europe
netball